Doddaballapura is a City in Bangalore Rural district in the state of Karnataka, India. Dodda means "big" in the native Kannada. it is an industrial city which houses several multiple national  companies it lies 40 km away from Banglore .

The place is mentioned as Ballalapura thanda in a record dated 1598 AD from the local Adinarayana temple. It might have originated from Hoysala name Ballala, and later corrupted as Ballapura. It is also believed that the village has derived its name from the circumstance that a cow used to drop one 'balla' of milk over a certain anthill and this omen led to the foundation of the town. From 'balla' the name Ballapura was thus derived.

Economy
Doddaballapur is about 40 km from Bangalore towards North on Bangalore-Hindupur state highway (SH-9). This town is known for weaving silk Sarees. Majority of Taluk's population are still Agriculture as main source of income. In town area people are dependent on weaving related business (mainly power looms). Thousands of town working group travel daily to Bengaluru for work. 

Bashettihalli is a nearby town with numerous industries. 

The industrial area including a huge apparel park and it has multiple national and international garments factories established - employs thousands of people in and around Doddaballapur including people from Gauribidanur travelling daily to the industrial area. 

Upcoming Projects:

The site of the upcoming $22 billion,  BIAL IT Investment Region, the largest IT region in India and one of the largest infrastructure projects in Karnataka's history.

Connectivity

Roadways
Doddaballapur is connected to the Greater Bangalore metropolitan area through Karnataka State Highway 9 and is situated about 20 km away from the suburb of Yelahanka. The road is a paved 4 lane highway. National Highway 648, a stub of NH - 48 passes through Doddaballapur. This highway connects Dobbaspet to Hosur. State highway 74 also passes through the city. This highway connects Nelamangala town to Chikkaballapur.

Rail
Doddaballapur railway station (Station code: DBU) is a 4 platform railway station situated on the Bangalore - Guntakal electrified double line. No trains originate here, however multiple important trains originating from Bangalore travelling northwards to cities like Mumbai, New Delhi, Hyderabad, Nagpur, Jaipur etc.. halt here. These trains provide rail connectivity to nearby cities like Bangalore, Hindupur, Anantapur and Dharmavaram. The railway station is maintained by Southwestern Railway zone of Indian railways.

Air
At present there is no airport exclusively built for the city. The closest airport is Kempegowda International airport situated north of Bangalore.

References

External links

Cities and towns in Bangalore Rural district